Mea Dematao Bernal (born 24 November 1989) is a Filipino footballer who has played as a defender for the Philippines women's national team.

Bernal scored her first international goal in the Philippines 11–0 win over Macau in a friendly held in Carmona on 3 August 2019.

She has also played for the women's football team of the Far Eastern University in the UAAP Football Championship. In the 2013 season, Bernal was named as the Best Defender.

International career

International goals 

Scores and results list the Philippines' goal tally first.

References

External links
 

1989 births
Living people
Filipino women's footballers
Philippines women's international footballers
Women's association football defenders
Competitors at the 2017 Southeast Asian Games
University Athletic Association of the Philippines footballers
Competitors at the 2019 Southeast Asian Games
Southeast Asian Games competitors for the Philippines